Klaus Mlynek (born 16 January 1936) is a German historian and scientific archivist.

Life 
The following year, he received his diploma as scientific archivist. The doctorate followed in 1961.

His focus of research have been aspects of Hanover's urban history.

Publications 
Mlynek worked with Waldemar R. Röhrbein, the long-standing director of the Historisches Museum Hannover, on several publications:
 1994: , 
 Vol. 1: Von den Anfängen bis zum Beginn des 19. Jahrhunderts. in collaboration with Helmut Plath, Siegfried Müller and Carl-Hans Hauptmeyer, 
 Vol. 2: Vom Beginn des 19. Jahrhunderts bis in die Gegenwart, in collaboration with Dieter Brosius, 
He worked on other publications after he retired:
 2001: 
 2002: 
 2009: .

References

External links 
 

German archivists
20th-century German historians
German editors
1936 births
Living people
Writers from Poznań